Mensingeweer is a small village in the Netherlands; it is located in the municipality of Het Hogeland, Groningen. It lies on the provincial road  from Winsum to Leens at the crossroads to Eenrum. The long-distance footpath called Pieterpad runs through the town and the Michaelkerk has an old Arp Schnitger organ that came from a church in Pieterburen and was installed in 1901. The town also has an old windmill called the Hollands Welvaart built in 1855.

History 
Mensingeweer is a terp (artificial mount) village from the middle ages. It was first mentioned in 1371 as Mensingheweere. The name means wharf for population belonging to Mense. In 1663, the village started to expand due to the construction of a canal between Winsum and Ulrum.

Doopsgezinde kerk
A Mennonite church was built at Mensingeweer, dedicated on 4 April 1819. It was served by a series of freshly-appointed young ministers from the Amsterdam seminary, but in the 20th century it was increasingly difficult to find ministers willing to serve there and it was demolished in 1959 in favor of a new church in Eenrum.

List of Mennonite teachers

Gallery

References and footnotes

External links 
 

Het Hogeland
Populated places in Groningen (province)